Mystek is a fictional character in the DC Comics universe. Created by Christopher Priest and Manny Clark in the Ray (vol. 2) #12 (May 1995) and died in Justice League Task Force #32 (February 1996).

Fictional character biography
Very little information has been revealed about Mystek's life, prior to her first confrontation with the Ray. Seong was a young Korean woman, born in Queens, New York, who preferred to be called 'Barclay'. Her father was involved with some sort of sensitive work, and was captured (possibly by some form of government agency), leading to her fear of federal agents. At some point, she had an ally named 'Tank', who was later killed. During an undisclosed incident in Seoul, she developed intense claustrophobia. She had an enemy named 'War Locke', whom she killed in a place called 'Empire Valley'. Lastly, her costume was sculpted to resemble a male physique, in order to further hide her true identity.

The Ray
In Philadelphia, Seong owned Circuit Shack, an electronics store, and was residing in the basement. Raymond Terrill, secretly known as the Ray, went shopping at her store, setting off sensors which registered him as a powerful metahuman. Believing that he was sent to capture her, she assaulted him, while he attempted to protect his identity by not directly confronting her. He ultimately used his solid light powers to create a simulacrum of himself, so she would believe that the Ray and Raymond Terrill were two separate individuals, and she did in fact relent.

Some time later, after seeing through his trickery, Mystek again pursued the Ray. She journeyed to his apartment, where she stumbled across his electron shield, a device which allowed access to the headquarters of the Justice League Task Force, of which Ray was a member. Seong was transported before the assembled JLTF, and, believing that they were a government agency abducting her for experimentation, she attacked. She blasted her way out of their headquarters and escaped.

Justice League Task Force
Weeks later, J'onn J'onzz, the Martian Manhunter and leader of the JLTF, entered her store while in his human guise. Seong immediately determined his true identity, and flew outside to confront him. After a brief battle, J'onn explained to her that he had perceived her prior panic and recklessness as signs that she needed assistance, and, seeing some potential within her, offered her membership to his team. J'onn gave her an electron shield of her own and a new costume which also included sculpted male anatomy, convincing her that he knew the secret of her gender.

Death
While she accepted his offer, her tenure was brief. Soon after joining them, the team was on a mission to the planet Xanthcar, where another member of the JLTF was being put on trial. The cramped space-fairing pod proved to be too much for the extremely claustrophobic Mystek, and, after over two days of travel, she panicked, blasting her way into open space. She soon suffocated and died.

Powers and abilities
Mystek could manipulate energy at a subatomic level, using quarks to form high-tolerance elastic, proactive matter. This hybridized state of matter was not pure energy, and therefore could pass harmlessly through an immaterial foe. She could use any electronic device as a window for this matter, allowing her a range of abilities, including flight. She was also able to use this matter offensively, in the form of energy blasts, and to read magnetic signatures.

Notes
 Her real name has never been revealed, but parts of her name are Seong and Barclay.
 Mystek's sudden death was actually the result of behind the scenes workings. Created by Christopher Priest to be a creator-owned character starring in her own miniseries, Priest was told to put her in Justice League Task Force to generate hype for her in advance. When the plans for the miniseries fell through, Priest simply killed off the character. He commented thus on the Usenet Newsgroups:
Forum: rec.arts.comics.dc.universe
Subject: Re: MYSTEK: DON'T KILL HIM/HER OFF
Date: 1996/01/17
Author: Priest <cll24j90@rmii.com>

The decision to croak Mystek ws *mine*. I did not get a raw deal, DC is not evil. It was a comedy of errors. I should *not* have written Mystek into DC continuity in advance of their decision whether or not to acquire the character. This was my fault. Me. Mine.

[T]here's still about 90% of backstory and depth you haven't seen. But DC evaluated the concept fairly, and decided it does not meet their current needs.

...

I'd probably have a seizure if Mystek came back anytime soon.

Part of the reason M was so flat for so long was my treading water while waiting for a decision. What *was* published isn't really enough for me to take out a second mortgage to buy [her] back.

Mystek is ™ and Copyright DC Comics, from the moment of his appearance in The Ray #12.

References
Christopher Priest discussing his run on JLTF, including the death of Mystek
Cosmic Teams: Mystek

Comics characters introduced in 1995
DC Comics female superheroes
DC Comics metahumans
Korean superheroes
Fictional Korean American people
Fictional characters from New York City
Characters created by Christopher Priest